This page is an overview of Malaysia at the UCI Track Cycling World Championships.

List of medalists 
This is the list of Malaysian medals won at the UCI Track World Championships. This list does not include the amateur disciplines and defunct disciplines.

Medal table

Medals by discipline
updated after the 2020 UCI Track Cycling World Championships

Medals by championships
updated after the 2020 UCI Track Cycling World Championships

2005 
Malaysia competed at the 2005 UCI Track Cycling World Championships in Los Angeles, United States from 24 to 27 March. The event consisted of 15 disciplines for men and women. Malaysia sent a team of 1 man and 2 women.

Individual pursuit

Keirin

Scratch

2006 
Malaysia competed at the 2006 UCI Track Cycling World Championships in Bordeaux, France from 13 to 16 April. The event consisted of 15 disciplines for men and women. Malaysia sent 1 man.

Sprint

Keirin

2007 
Malaysia competed at the 2007 UCI Track Cycling World Championships in Palma de Mallorca, Spain from 29 March to 1 April. The event consisted of 17 disciplines for men and women. Malaysia sent a team of 3 men.

Sprint

Time trial

Team sprint

Keirin

2008 
Malaysia competed at the 2008 UCI Track Cycling World Championships in Manchester, Great Britain from 26 to 30 March. The event consisted of 18 disciplines for men and women. Malaysia sent a team of 5 men.

Sprint

Time trial

Team sprint

Keirin

Scratch

2009 
Malaysia competed at the 2009 UCI Track Cycling World Championships in Pruszków, Poland from 25 to 29 March. The event consisted of 19 disciplines for men and women. Malaysia sent a team of 3 men.

Sprint

Time trial

Team sprint

Keirin

2010 
Malaysia competed at the 2010 UCI Track Cycling World Championships in Ballerup, Denmark from 24 to 28 March. The event consisted of 19 disciplines for men and women. Malaysia sent a team of 2 men.

Sprint

Keirin

2011 
Malaysia competed at the 2011 UCI Track Cycling World Championships in Apeldoorn, Netherlands from 23 to 27 March. The event consisted of 19 disciplines for men and women. Malaysia sent a team of 4 men and 1 woman.

Sprint

Time trial

Team sprint

Keirin

Scratch

2012 
Malaysia competed at the 2012 UCI Track Cycling World Championships in Melbourne, Australia from 4 to 8 April. The event consisted of 19 disciplines for men and women. Malaysia sent a team of 5 men and 1 woman.

Sprint

Time trial

Team sprint

Keirin

Scratch

Points race

2013 
Malaysia competed at the 2013 UCI Track Cycling World Championships in Minsk, Belarus from 20 to 24 February. The event consisted of 19 disciplines for men and women. Malaysia sent 1 man.

Keirin

2014 
Malaysia competed at the 2014 UCI Track Cycling World Championships in Cali, Colombia from 26 February to 2 March. The event consisted of 19 disciplines for men and women. Malaysia sent a team of 1 man and 2 women.

Sprint

Keirin

Scratch

2015 
Malaysia competed at the 2015 UCI Track Cycling World Championships in Yvelines, France from 18 to 22 February. The event consisted of 19 disciplines for men and women. Malaysia sent a team of 2 men and 1 woman.

Sprint

Keirin

2016 
Malaysia competed at the 2016 UCI Track Cycling World Championships in London, Great Britain from 2 to 6 March. The event consisted of 19 disciplines for men and women. Malaysia sent a team of 1 man and 1 woman.

Sprint

Keirin

2017 
Malaysia competed at the 2017 UCI Track Cycling World Championships in Hong Kong from 12 to 16 April. The event consisted of 20 disciplines for men and women. Malaysia sent a team of 2 men.

Sprint

Keirin

2018 
Malaysia competed at the 2018 UCI Track Cycling World Championships in Apeldoorn, Netherlands from 28 February to 4 March. The event consisted of 20 disciplines for men and women. Malaysia sent a team of 2 men.

Sprint

Keirin

2019 
Malaysia competed at the 2019 UCI Track Cycling World Championships in Pruszków, Poland from 27 February to 3 March. The event consisted of 20 disciplines for men and women. Malaysia sent a team of 3 men.

Sprint

Team sprint

Keirin

2020 
Malaysia competed at the 2020 UCI Track Cycling World Championships in Berlin, Germany from 26 February to 1 March. The event consisted of 20 disciplines for men and women. Malaysia sent a team of 3 men.

Sprint

Time trial

Keirin

References

Nations at the UCI Track Cycling World Championships
Malaysia at cycling events